Mawlawi Alam Gul Haqqani is an Afghan Taliban politician who is currently serving as head of the Afghan passport Department since September 2021.

References

Year of birth missing (living people)
Living people
Taliban members
21st-century Afghan people